Perkins Square Gazebo is a historic gazebo located at Baltimore, Maryland, United States. It is an eight-sided, cast iron, open structure of eclectic Victorian design.  It was constructed in 1871 and located in a triangular-shaped park in West Baltimore. It is currently located within the Heritage Crossing townhome community that was constructed on the former site of the Murphy Homes public housing project.

Perkins Square Gazebo was listed on the National Register of Historic Places in 1983.

References

External links
, including photo from 1983, at Maryland Historical Trust
 Perkins Square at Explore Baltimore Heritage

Buildings and structures on the National Register of Historic Places in Baltimore
Infrastructure completed in 1871
Victorian architecture in Maryland
Upton, Baltimore
Gazebos